Brett Daniel Tomko (born April 7, 1973) is an American former professional baseball pitcher. He played in Major League Baseball (MLB) for the Cincinnati Reds, San Diego Padres, Seattle Mariners, St. Louis Cardinals, San Francisco Giants, Los Angeles Dodgers, New York Yankees, Oakland Athletics, Texas Rangers, and Kansas City Royals.

Early life
Tomko was born in Euclid, Ohio, but moved to southern California when he was three years old.

Tomko attended El Dorado High School in Placentia, California, and was a letter winner in basketball and baseball.

College years
He went 15–2 with a 1.35 ERA and struck out 154 batters in 126.3 innings that season, with opponents hitting just .180 against him. He pitched two complete game shutouts in the Championship Series, including one in the final game, earning him the Tournament's "outstanding player" award. In addition, he won both the  NCAA Division II Pitcher and Player of the Year Awards by the American Baseball Coaches Association.

In 2014, the NCAA Division II Pitcher of the Year Award was renamed the Brett Tomko Award in his honor.

Draft and minor league years
Tomko had been drafted out of high school by the Los Angeles Dodgers in the 20th round of the  draft, but chose to attend college at Mt. San Antonio College (Walnut, California) for a year. In 1995, he was drafted in the second round by the Cincinnati Reds. He signed with the Reds on June 28, 1995.

Major League Baseball

Cincinnati Reds
Tomko made his first Major League appearance, and first Major League start, against the Philadelphia Phillies on May 27, 1997. He pitched 6 innings and gave up 2 runs while taking the loss in the Reds 2–1 defeat.

He got his first victory in his next start on June 6, against the New York Mets. He pitched 6 innings, gave up one run and struck out seven in the Reds 5–2 victory.

Tomko was 3rd for the Reds in his rookie 1997 season in Wins Above Replacement (WAR) with 3.0.

He remained in the Reds starting rotation for three seasons, though spending some time as a reliever during a more difficult 1999 campaign.

Seattle Mariners
He was traded on February 10, to the Seattle Mariners, along with Antonio Pérez, Jake Meyer, and Mike Cameron for Ken Griffey Jr. Seattle used him primarily as a reliever and spot starter during the next two seasons. He also spent some time with Seattle's Triple-A team in Tacoma in both 2000 & .

San Diego Padres
On December 11, 2001, the Mariners traded Tomko (along with Ramón Vázquez, Tom Lampkin and cash) to the San Diego Padres in exchange for Wascar Serrano, Alex Arias and Ben Davis. He returned to the starting rotation with San Diego, making 32 starts, his most since  with the Reds.

St. Louis Cardinals
He was traded again, almost exactly a year later (December 15) to the St. Louis Cardinals for Mike Wodnicki and Luther Hackman. Tomko won 13 games in his only season in St. Louis. His solid winning record was in spite of leading the league giving up earned runs.

San Francisco Giants
He signed with the San Francisco Giants as a free agent prior to the  season and pitched with them for two seasons. His 2004 season was very good, garnering a 2.6 WAR and a .611 winning percentage. Tomko's tenure with the Giants effectively ended when the team declined to offer him salary arbitration before the  season.

Los Angeles Dodgers
On December 21, he agreed to a two-year contract worth a reported $8.7 million with the Los Angeles Dodgers. He pitched both as a starter and a reliever during his two seasons in Los Angeles. During his time with the Dodgers, Tomko's poor pitching and propensity to give up home runs led to Dodger fans giving him the nickname "Bombko".

He was designated for assignment on August 24, after a poor season with the Dodgers in which he went 2–11 with a 5.80 ERA in 33 games (15 starts).

San Diego Padres (second stint)
After being designated for assignment by the Dodgers, he was signed by the San Diego Padres on September 4, 2007.

Kansas City Royals
On January 20, he signed with the Kansas City Royals.

On June 12, 2008, the Royals designated Tomko for assignment and on June 20, 2008, he was released.

San Diego Padres (third stint)
He signed with the San Diego Padres on June 27, 2008, but was released on September 1.

New York Yankees
On February 13, 2009, the New York Yankees signed Tomko to a minor league contract with an invitation to spring training. He began the season with Triple-A Scranton. He was called up by the Yankees on May 9.  Tomko was designated for assignment on July 21, 2009, to make room on the roster for Sergio Mitre.  He criticized the Yankees for not using him enough, despite his excellent spring training and minor league numbers, and said his 5.25 ERA was due to a lack of use. He was released on July 29.

Oakland Athletics
He then signed with  the Oakland Athletics. On August 17, 2009, Tomko defeated the Yankees in his first start for Oakland. Tomko got his 100th career win with Oakland, however he injured his arm during the game.

He resigned with Oakland during the 2009-2010 offseason and rehabbed with the Sacramento River Cats.

Texas Rangers
On February 19, 2011, the Texas Rangers signed Tomko to a minor league contract with no invitation to spring training. On April 20, the Rangers purchased his contract from the minors and called him up. He was outrighted to Triple-A on May 27. After the 2011 season, he elected for free agency.

Later years
On February 19, 2012, Tomko signed a minor league contract with the Cincinnati Reds worth $480,000. On August 2, 2012, Tomko was released by the Reds. Tomko was 0–6 with a 3.78 ERA in 12 starts with Triple-A Louisville. In a rehab start with the Arizona League Reds, he lasted 1.1 innings, giving up eight runs (seven earned) off of nine hits.

Tomko signed a minor league contract with the Arizona Diamondbacks on August 14, 2012. He was assigned to the Double-A Mobile BayBears. On August 24, Tomko was called up to the Reno Aces.

In March 2013, Tomko signed a contract with the York Revolution of the independent Atlantic League of Professional Baseball. He retired in August and joined the Kansas City Royals organization as a scout.

On March 14, 2014, Tomko agreed to a minor league contract with the Kansas City Royals. On June 3, Tomko was released by the Royals.

Tomko signed a minor league deal with the Colorado Rockies on June 10, 2014.

Personal life
Tomko married Playboy Playmate Julia Schultz (February 1998) in November 2003, and they have twin boys.

Tomko is an artist. As of 2017, he was training with famous sports artist Opie Otterstad.

Tomko's father won a contest of over 11,000 entries in The Plain Dealer for naming the Cleveland Cavaliers NBA team. His entry described the name Cavaliers as "a group of daring, fearless men whose life's pact was never surrender, no matter what the odds."

References

External links

1973 births
Living people
American people of Slovak descent
People from Euclid, Ohio
Baseball players from Cleveland
Major League Baseball pitchers
Cincinnati Reds players
Seattle Mariners players
San Diego Padres players
St. Louis Cardinals players
San Francisco Giants players
Los Angeles Dodgers players
Kansas City Royals players
New York Yankees players
Oakland Athletics players
Texas Rangers players
Mt. SAC Mounties baseball players
Florida Southern Moccasins baseball players
Charleston AlleyCats players
Chattanooga Lookouts players
Indianapolis Indians players
Tacoma Rainiers players
Fresno Grizzlies players
Las Vegas 51s players
Portland Beavers players
Lake Elsinore Storm players
Scranton/Wilkes-Barre Yankees players
Sacramento River Cats players
Arizona League Athletics players
Stockton Ports players
Round Rock Express players
Louisville Bats players
Arizona League Reds players
Mobile BayBears players
Reno Aces players
York Revolution players
Omaha Storm Chasers players
Colorado Springs Sky Sox players
Leones del Escogido players
American expatriate baseball players in the Dominican Republic